The canton of Condé-sur-Vire is an administrative division of the Manche department, northwestern France. It was created at the French canton reorganisation which came into effect in March 2015. Its seat is in Condé-sur-Vire.

It consists of the following communes:

Beaucoudray
Beuvrigny
Biéville
Condé-sur-Vire
Domjean
Fourneaux
Gouvets
Lamberville
Montrabot
Moyon-Villages
Le Perron
Saint-Amand-Villages
Saint-Jean-d'Elle
Saint-Louet-sur-Vire
Saint-Vigor-des-Monts
Tessy-Bocage
Torigny-les-Villes

References

Cantons of Manche